Rebecka Maria Blomqvist (born 24 July 1997) is a Swedish footballer forward who currently plays for VfL Wolfsburg and the Sweden national team.

Career 
After spending her first professional years at her youth club Kopparbergs/Göteborg FC and attracting attention with strong performances, she moved to German serial champions VfL Wolfsburg during the 2020/2021 winter break. She made her debut for the Wolves on 05.02.2021 in the match against Turbine Potsdam, scoring her first Bundesliga goal.

International goal

Honors 
Sweden U19
Winner
 UEFA Women's Under-19 Championship: 2015

References

External links 
 

1997 births
Living people
Swedish women's footballers
Swedish expatriate sportspeople in Germany
Expatriate women's footballers in Germany
BK Häcken FF players
Damallsvenskan players
Women's association football forwards
Footballers at the 2020 Summer Olympics
Olympic footballers of Sweden
Olympic medalists in football
Medalists at the 2020 Summer Olympics
Olympic silver medalists for Sweden
Footballers from Gothenburg
Sweden women's international footballers
UEFA Women's Euro 2022 players
VfL Wolfsburg (women) players
Frauen-Bundesliga players